The following radio stations broadcast on AM frequency 1580 kHz: 1580 AM is a Canadian clear-channel frequency. See list of broadcast station classes.

Argentina
 LT 36 in Chacabuco, Buenos Aires
 LT 27 in Villaguay, Entre Rios
 Tradición in San Martin
 26 de Julio in Longchamps, Buenos Aires
 La Cueva in 25 de Mayo, Buenos Aires

Canada
Stations in bold are clear-channel stations.

Mexico
 XELI-AM in Chilpancingo, Guerrero

United States

References

Lists of radio stations by frequency